The Iraqi Basketball League, officially known as 1XBET Iraqi Basketball League for sponsorship reasons, is the highest professional basketball league in Iraq.

Current clubs

List of champions

Recent finals

References

External links
AsiaBasket.com League Page

Basketball in Iraq
Basketball
Basketball leagues in Asia